Blastocrithidia is a genus of parasitic flagellate protist belonging to the family Trypanosomatidae. It is a monoxenous parasite of heteropteran insects, mainly inhabiting their hindgut and glands.

Characteristics 
In addition to Blastocrithidia, one-host trypanosomatids from hemipteran and dipteran insects have been traditionally placed in genera Crithidia, Leptomonas, Herpetomonas, Rhynchoidomonas, and  Wallaceina. Blastocrithidia is characterized by epimastigote morphological forms, whereas opisthomastigotes and endomastigotes are exclusive features of the genera Herpetomonas and Wallaceina, respectively. Blastocrithidia is also able to produce resistant cysts.

Systematics 

The genus includes the following species.
 Blastocrithidia caliroae Lipa, Carl & Valentine 1977
 Blastocrithidia cyrtomeni Caicedo et al. 2011
 Blastocrithidia euschisti Hanson & McGhee
 Blastocrithidia familiaris Tieszen et al. 1986
 Blastocrithidia gerridis (Patton 1908) Laird
 Blastocrithidia largi Maslov and Lukes 2010
 Blastocrithidia leptocoridis (McCulloch 1915)
 Blastocrithidia miridarum Podlipaev & Frolov 1987
 Blastocrithidia papi Frolov and Kostygov, 2016
 Blastocrithidia raabei Lipa 1966
 Blastocrithidia triatomae Cerisola et al. 1971
 Blastocrithidia vagoi Tuzet & Laporte 1965
 Blastocrithidia nonstop Votýpka & Lukeš, sp. nov.

Genomics

Genetic code 
Blastocrithidia uses in its nuclear genome an alternative genetic code characterized by all three canonical stop codons reassigned to sense codons.

References 

Trypanosomatida
Parasitic excavates
Euglenozoa genera